The 1996–97 Elitserien season was the 22nd season of the Elitserien, the top level of ice hockey in Sweden. 12 teams participated in the league, and Färjestads BK won the championship.

Standings

Playoffs

External links
 Swedish Hockey League official site

Swe
1996–97 in Swedish ice hockey
Swedish Hockey League seasons